= Kilmory Castle, Bute =

Coordinates: 55.8043°N 5.1117°W

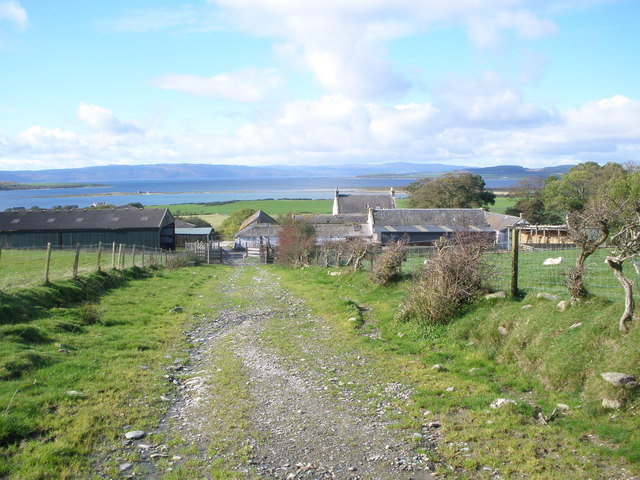
The remains of Kilmory Castle are incorporated into Meikle Kilmory Farm, Bute

Kilmory Castle (Kilmorie Castle, Crowner's Castle) is the remains of a 15th-century castle at Meikle Kilmory, Isle of Bute, Scotland. The castle was the residence of the Jamiesons of Kilmorie, and was already a ruin in the 18th century. The Jamiesons of Kilmorie were the hereditary coroners of Bute. The ruins are a secular listed building.
